

Angiopoietin-2 is a protein that in humans is encoded by the ANGPT2 gene.

Naturally occurring antagonist for both ANGPT1 and TIE2; expressed only at the sites of vascular remodeling; similar to angiopoietin-1

Function 
 See Angiopoietin#Clinical relevance

Interactions 

ANGPT2 has been shown to interact with TEK tyrosine kinase.

See also 
 Angiopoietin

References

External links

Further reading